Saviour Machine is an American Christian gothic metal band that formed in 1989. They have released five studio albums and two live albums on Frontline and subsequently on MCM Music, distributed through Massacre Records. Saviour Machine's music and lyrics deal with war, death, and personal introspection as it relates to prophecy and divine revelation.

History

Formation and early years (1989–1993)
The band was formed by brothers Jeff and Eric Clayton in mid-1989. By the time of its first tour in 1993, the band was Eric Clayton – vocals, Jeff Clayton – guitars, Dean Forsyth – bass, Jayson Heart – drums, and Nathan Van Hala – keyboards. The band took its name from a song on the David Bowie album The Man Who Sold the World.

The Legend trilogy (1997–2007)
Saviour Machine next turned to the Legend trilogy. Legend was advertised as "the unofficial soundtrack to the end of the world" in promotional materials owing to its study of end-time Biblical prophecy. The Legend trilogy comprises four full-length CDs totaling more than five hours of music. Legend I and Legend II were released in 1997 and 1998, respectively. The studio composition of the band stayed the same through "Legend II" after which Jeff Clayton and Jayson Heart left the band. Legend III:I was released in 2001. The long-awaited final disc, Legend III:II, was scheduled to be released July 7, 2007. Legend parts I through III:I were released by MCM Music and Massacre Records; however, Legend III:II was released independently. On May 27, 2007, Eric Clayton released a statement on the Saviour Machine MySpace blog saying that, due to health problems, he would not be able to finish Legend III:II in time to make the July 7 release date. He released samples of rough mixes of each song on Legend III:II on SeventhCircle.net throughout July.

Most of the lyrical content of the Legend series is based on the Book of Revelation and other Biblical prophecy. The first album draws from the Old Testament and New Testament, except the Book of Revelation, and include biblical references and a concordance. Legend II continues where part one ended - the rise of the antichrist. Musically, the Legend albums showcase a further refinement of Saviour Machine's rock and classical music style.

Saviour Machine has performed a limited number of concerts in the US, Germany and Mexico City since undertaking the Legend trilogy. A second live album was released in 2002, again featuring a performance from Owen Teck Rocknight in Owen, Germany. Live in Deutschland 2002 featured selections from Legend I, Legend II and Legend III:I.

Re-union and plan for new release (2017–present) 

According to an interview with Eric Clayton during Wacken Open Air 2017 as well as statements on the Facebook page and YouTube channel of the band, they are working on a new album to be released in the future. It will not be part of the Legend-trilogy, but follow the first two releases of the band.

Discography

Members
Current members
 Eric Clayton – vocals (1989–present)
 Jeff Clayton – guitar (1989–present)
 Nathan Van Hala – piano (1993–present)
 Charles Cooper – bass (1995–present)
Samuel West – drums (1992–1993, 2011–present)

Former members
 Chris Fee – drums (1989–1992)
 Dean Forsyth – bass (1989–1995)
 Jayson Heart – drums (1993–1999)
 Victor Deaton – drums (2000–2001)
 Carl Johan Grimmark – guitar (2001–2004)
 Thomas Weinesjö – drums (2001–2004)

Timeline

References

External links
 Official Facebook Page
 Official Youtube Channel
 Old website on WebArchive.org

American symphonic metal musical groups
Musical groups established in 1989
American gothic metal musical groups
Heavy metal musical groups from California